Ronald Thomas Fearon  (born 19 November 1960) is an English retired professional football goalkeeper. He made 115 appearances in the Football League, as well as 47 appearances in the Major Indoor Soccer League for the Wichita Wings.

In 1984, he trained with the San Diego Sockers of the Major Indoor Soccer League (MISL) while visiting his wife's family who lived in California. In 1989, Terry Nicholl, coach of the Wichita Wings of the MISL called Fearon and invited him to a trial. At the time, Ipswich Town was asking for a transfer fee of approximately £140,000. Ipswich Town waived the fee for the transfer to the Wings. He signed with the Wings on 1 October 1989. In the summer of 1990, West Bromwich Albion expressed an interest in signing Fearon, but he decided to extend his contract with the Wings after Ipswich Town reinstated the transfer fee now that Fearon was returning to England.

On 12 June 1996, Fearon signed with the Columbus Crew of Major League Soccer. He played no games and was soon back in England.

In September 1999, he joined Hendon as cover for the injured Gary McCann and made five league and cup appearances in his single season at the club.

References

External links

1960 births
Living people
Footballers from Romford
Ashford United F.C. players
Barnet F.C. players
Brighton & Hove Albion F.C. players
Chelmsford City F.C. players
Columbus Crew players
Dover F.C. players
Dover Athletic F.C. players
English footballers
English Football League players
English expatriate footballers
Association football goalkeepers
Hendon F.C. players
Ipswich Town F.C. players
Leyton Orient F.C. players
Major Indoor Soccer League (1978–1992) players
National League (English football) players
Reading F.C. players
Southend United F.C. players
Southern Football League players
Sutton United F.C. players
Walsall F.C. players
Wichita Wings (MISL) players
English expatriate sportspeople in the United States
Expatriate soccer players in the United States